The National Premier Soccer League (NPSL) is an American men's soccer league. The NPSL is a semi-professional league, comprising some teams that have paid players and some that are entirely amateur. The league is officially affiliated to the United States Adult Soccer Association (USASA) and has automatic qualification for the U.S. Open Cup. It is the successor of the Men's Premier Soccer League, a regional league originally based in the Western United States, which has now expanded nationwide to encompass teams from 29 states. The league's motto is "A National League with a Regional Focus".

Competition format
The National Premier Soccer League is divided into four separate regions (Northeast, South, Midwest, and West). Each region is divided into conferences with a varying number of teams per conference. The regular season runs from May to July with the exception of the West Region that has historically started in late March or early April.

The NPSL currently has automatic berths in the U.S. Open Cup where they gain eligibility towards the CONCACAF Champions League.

History
The National Premier Soccer League began in 2003 as the Men's Premier Soccer League (MPSL) initially as an offshoot of the Women's Premier Soccer League, and marked the first instance of a women's soccer league spawning a men's league. The league's first two champions were the Arizona Sahuaros, who had defected to the MPSL from the USL D-3 Pro League, and the Utah Salt Ratz.

The league expanded into the Midwest in 2005 with the addition of several new teams and a new conference, and changed its name to National Premier Soccer League to reflect its new national footprint; a team from the expansion conference – Detroit Arsenal – won the league in its first year after its eastward expansion. The NPSL expanded further in 2007 with the addition of a new Northeast Conference and five new teams from the eastern United States. The first team from the East to win the national NPSL title was the Pennsylvania Stoners in 2008. The league has since continued to expand, adding more teams throughout the entirety of the country.

Since its inception, the league has managed to place at least one team actively playing under its banner into U.S. Open Cup competition. Though the showing of the NPSL in US Open Cup play was typically only one or two teams in its first six years, the 2009 and 2010 cups have seen four and three, respectively, NPSL teams in each tournament. The recent success of the NPSL in USASA qualifying has encouraged a movement by which the league could have automatic berths in the final tournament. The furthest a team from the NPSL has reached in the US Open Cup during the professional era (1997 and onward after the entry of MLS teams) has been the third round. However, the Brooklyn Italians have won the US Open Cup outright before the existence of either MLS or the NPSL.

Although no team has ever won the league twice, the Miami FC camp has won the championship twice as a club. Its reserve team (Miami FC 2) won the 2018 title, and its first team (Miami FC) won the 2019 championship.

Status
Officially the USSF does not recognize formal levels of the soccer pyramid below the professional 3rd tier. The USSF does not officially recognize distinctions between amateur soccer leagues in the United States. However, the USASA sanctions affiliated, but separately run, national leagues that are recognized in practical terms as playing at a higher level than the USASA state association leagues; for example, they receive automatic berths to the US Open Cup.

The National Premier Soccer League attracts top amateur talent from around the United States. NPSL does not have any age limits or restrictions, thus incorporating both college players and former professional players alike.

Organization
The NPSL is organized in a mostly decentralized structure and is managed as a team-run league. Each year the member clubs help elect a chairman, treasurer, and secretary and an eight-member board of directors. Each team is individually owned and operated, and is responsible for maintaining league minimum standards. New teams seeking membership into the NPSL are subject to approval from an executive committee of existing team owners. Member clubs have the right to make localized decisions for their respective markets, conferences, and regions based on what they believe is best for their particular region. Each conference is managed by the individual member clubs and elects a conference commission each year.

The current chairman is Kenny Farrell of the New Orleans Jesters.

The costs to join the league as of 2016 are reported to be a one-time $15,000 franchise fee and a $5,250 annual league fee. The low entry fee compared to USL League Two's of $50,000 has made the league an attractive alternative to teams looking to compete at the highest level of amateur play.

The league requires that all teams play in stadiums with at least 500 seats, a scoreboard, and locker rooms with showers for both teams and officials. The home team is also responsible for providing water and food for the visiting team, ensuring there is a trainer or doctor on-site for the match, and paying the referees fees at the end of each game.

Sponsorship and partnerships
Mitre Sports International provided the official ball for the NPSL starting in 2014.  Global Scarves began providing custom soccer scarves throughout the league, and worked with the NPSL on various events and contests to increase awareness and fervor throughout the 2014 NPSL season.  Renegade GK, hummel, MyCujoo, Passage, Carbon Athletics, GCG Sports, Activate Canopy, and HomeLight are all listed as current business partners (2021).

Teams

Current teams

Expansion

Rivalries 
Many NPSL teams have rivalries given the close geography of the teams throughout the league. The most notable rivalry was the Rust Belt Derby contested between Detroit City FC, AFC Cleveland, and FC Buffalo. The name refers to the teams' shared region, the Rust Belt. Another intense rivalry existed between the San Diego Flash and San Diego Boca/Force FC, which were crosstown rivals in San Diego. Until the 2013 sale and rebranding of Force FC from Boca FC, the ownership groups of the two clubs were previously partners in the original San Diego Flash club of the A-League that competed from 1998 to 2001.

NPSL Members Cup 
The NPSL Members Cup, originally called the NPSL Founders Cup, was a competition that ran from August to October 2019. It was initially intended to lead to a new professional league beginning play in the spring of 2020. However, following the departure of numerous previously announced teams and issues in launching the professional league the tournament was altered.

Detroit City FC won the cup on October 16, 2019, when the team defeated Michigan Stars FC, 1–0, in the penultimate game of the tournament.

Records and champions

Awards

NPSL Golden Boot

NPSL Young Player of the Year 
 2018: Joseph Okumu, AFC Ann Arbor
 2019: Jamie Smith, Asheville City SC
 2020: none awarded due to COVID-19
 2021: Ben Bender, FC Baltimore Christos
 2022: Josh Jones, Philadelphia Ukrainian Nationals

Back-office
Executive committee
 Kenny Farrell  – New Orleans Jesters – chairman 
 John Nunan – Sacramento Gold FC – corporate secretary
 Steven Wagoner – Virginia Beach City FC – corporate treasurer

NPSL board of directors
 Adam Lewin – FC Davis
 Brandon Jantz – Temecula FC
 John Melody – Erie Commodores FC
 Tim Sas – Duluth FC
 Nathan Walter – Jacksonville Armada FC U-23
 Sonny Dalesandro – Tulsa Athletic 
 Dennis Crowley – Kingston Stockade FC 
 Rich Sparling – Torch FC

NPSL leadership staff
 Cindy Spera – managing director
 Gary Moody – media relations
 Paul Scott – director of officials
 Dina Case – director of membership development
 Robin Shacket – director of operations and club services
 Jeff Pejsa – brand manager

eSports 
In April 2020, the NPSL launched a competitive gaming competition to promote the growth of the league in new areas. The league hopes to "bring its community members together for friendly competition on a virtual pitch". The first nine clubs to formally join the new eSports league were Atlantic City FC, Central Florida Panthers SC, Denton Diablos FC, Duluth FC, Fort Worth Vaqueros, FC Milwaukee Torrent, Muskegon Risers, Gate City FC, and Ozark FC.

The league partnered with Virtual Pro Gaming to assist in operations of the league. Clubs will play full 11 v 11 in pro clubs mode, on FIFA, EA Sports video game.

References

External links
 
NPSL YouTube channel

 
4
United States Adult Soccer Association leagues
2003 establishments in the United States
Sports leagues established in 2003